Archibald H. Davis Plantation, also known as Cypress Hall, is a historic plantation house and complex located near Justice, Franklin County, North Carolina.   The house was built about 1820, and is a two-story, five bay, Greek Revival style frame dwelling.  It has a full width front porch and rear ell added in the early-20th century.  Also on the property are log tobacco barns, a small barn, a larger barn, domestic outbuildings, and a building said to have been a trading post or stagecoach stop.

It was listed on the National Register of Historic Places in 1975.

References

Davis, Archibald Plantation
Houses on the National Register of Historic Places in North Carolina
Houses completed in 1820
Greek Revival houses in North Carolina
Houses in Franklin County, North Carolina
National Register of Historic Places in Franklin County, North Carolina